Patton Electronics was incorporated in 1984 and headquartered in Gaithersburg, Maryland, USA. Patton manufacture devices ranging from micro-sized widgets that connect "this-with-that," to carrier-grade Telecom gear that connects subscribers to service providers. Patton Electronics offers a wide range of electrical solutions.

References

External links
Patton Company Website
About Patton Electronics

Networking companies of the United States
Companies based in Gaithersburg, Maryland
Telecommunications companies established in 1984
1984 establishments in Maryland